Trabeops is a genus of spiders in the family Lycosidae. It was first described in 1959 by Roewer. , it contains only one species, Trabeops aurantiacus, found in the U.S. and Canada.

References

Lycosidae
Monotypic Araneomorphae genera
Spiders of North America
Taxa named by Carl Friedrich Roewer